Barcott is a surname. Notable people with the surname include:

Bruce Barcott (born 1966), American editor, environmental journalist, and author
Rye Barcott (born 1979), American social entrepreneur, investor, and author